This is a list of the main career statistics of professional American tennis player Alison Riske-Amritraj.

Performance timelines

Only main-draw results in WTA Tour, Grand Slam tournaments, Fed Cup/Billie Jean King Cup and Olympic Games are included in win–loss records.

Singles
Current after the 2023 Indian Wells Open.

Doubles
Current after the 2023 Australian Open.

Significant finals

Premier Mandatory/Premier 5 finals

Singles: 1 (runner up)

WTA career finals

Singles: 13 (3 titles, 10 runner-ups)

ITF Circuit finals

Singles: 13 (9 titles, 4 runner–ups)

Doubles: 4 (1 title, 3 runner–ups)

WTA Tour career earnings
Current after the 2022 French Open

Career Grand Slam statistics

Grand Slam seedings
The tournaments won by Riske are in boldface, and advanced into finals by Riske are in italics.

Best Grand Slam results details

Head-to-head record

Record against top 10 players
Active players are in boldface.

No. 1 wins

Top 10 wins

Notes

References

Riske, Alison